Walter von Moos (October 21, 1918 - January 5, 2016) was a Swiss industrialist and majority owner of von Moos Steel, which in 1996 became Swiss Steel and subsequently in 2006 merged with Schmolz + Bickenbach. The company was one of the oldest privately owned manufacturing companies in Switzerland.

Early life and education 
Walter von Moos was born October 21, 1918 in Lucerne, Switzerland to Ludwig (1877–1956) and Alice (née Zetter; 1884–1970). His father was a great-grandson of one of the company founders and a then director at von Moos'sche Eisenwerke (Moos Steel Works) which operated as a stock corporation.

Family 
Von Moos married the aristocrat Marcelle Sophie Maria Schnyder von Wartensee (1920–1999).

Literature 

 100 Jahre von Moos'sche Eisenwerke Luzern 1842-1942

External links 

 Moos, Walter von in Deutsche Biographie (in German) 
 Moos von, Walter in Base de données élites suisses (in French)

References 

1918 births
2016 deaths
Swiss industrialists